Francis Charles Beggs (22 May 1904 – 27 November 1969) was an Australian rules footballer who played with Fitzroy in the Victorian Football League (VFL).	

Beggs was originally from the Albury Football Club and played in their 1928 Ovens and Murray Football League premiership.

Beggs then played with the West Albury Football Club in 1929.

Beggs was cleared to Fitzroy along with Haydn Bunton, both from the West Albury Football Club in 1930.

Notes

External links 
		

1904 births
1969 deaths
Australian rules footballers from Victoria (Australia)
Fitzroy Football Club players
Albury Football Club players